{{DISPLAYTITLE:5-HT5B receptor}}
5-HT5B receptor is a 5-HT receptor protein and the gene which encodes it. The protein is found in rodents, but not in humans, because stop codons in the gene's coding sequence prevent the gene from expressing a functional protein.  It is believed that the function of the 5-HT5B receptor has been replaced in humans by some other subclass of 5-HT receptor.  5-HT5B receptor is a G protein-coupled receptor.  5-HT5B receptor mRNA is expressed primarily in the habenula, hippocampus and inferior olive of rat brains.  Known agonists for 5-HT5B include ergotamine and LSD. Known antagonists include methiothepin.

References

Serotonin receptors